Yuri Alekseyevich Pudyshev (3 April 1954 – 29 August 2021) was a Soviet and Belarusian football player and coach.

Coaching career
From 1997, Pudyshev worked closely with Yuri Puntus, following him to several teams as an assistant coach. He continued active lifestyle and in 2000s he briefly resumed his playing career twice, coming as substitute player in a cup game for MTZ-RIPO Minsk in 2007 and 2008 and again in a league game for Dinamo Brest in 2010, setting a record for oldest player in both competitions.

International career
Pudyshev played his only game for USSR on 28 March 1984 in a friendly against West Germany.

Honours
 Soviet Top League: 1982

References

External links
  Profile
 

1954 births
2021 deaths
People from Korolyov, Moscow Oblast
Russian footballers
Soviet footballers
Belarusian footballers
Association football midfielders
Soviet Union international footballers
Soviet Top League players
FC Dinamo Minsk players
FC Dynamo Moscow players
FC Dynamo Stavropol players
FC Dynamo Barnaul players
FK Dinamo Samarqand players
FC Yugra Nizhnevartovsk players
FC Partizan Minsk players
FC Dynamo Brest players
Belarusian football managers
Sportspeople from Moscow Oblast